Perm State Pharmaceutical Academy (full name: State budgetary educational institution of higher professional education "Perm State Pharmaceutical Academy") is a higher educational institution in Perm that trains specialists with a pharmaceutical education.

As of 2016, the academy includes 5 faculties and 20 departments.

History 

In 1918, a pharmaceutical department was created on the basis of the Perm State University.

1929 — the Faculty of Chemistry and Pharmacy was established at the Perm University.

In 1930, the university was disbanded, the Chemical Pharmaceutical Faculty was reorganized into an independent Institute of Chemical Technology. Together with the technical base, in 1931 he was transferred to the city of Berezniki.

1931 - Pharmaceutical Faculty was established at the Perm Medical Institute.

In 1936, the Faculty of Pharmacy was transformed into the Perm State Pharmaceutical Institute.

In 1995, the Perm State Pharmaceutical Institute received the status of an academy and was renamed the Perm State Pharmaceutical Academy.

In 2005, the academy received the name of the State Educational Institution of Higher Professional Education "Perm State Pharmaceutical Academy of the Federal Agency for Health and Social Development".

Current state 

As of 2011, the academy includes 5 faculties:

 faculty of full-time education;
 faculty of distance learning;
 faculty of training foreign citizens;
 Faculty of Additional Professional Education;
 faculty of pre-university training of youth.
4500 students, 50 graduate students, 6 doctoral students, 70 interns study at PSFA.

Teaching activities are carried out by 28 doctors of sciences, professors, 138 candidates of sciences, associate professors, 8 members of international academies, 6 honored health workers of the Russian Federation.

PGFA carries out educational activities under the following programs:

 for higher professional education programs:
 in the specialty "pharmacist";
 for Postgraduate education programs:
 graduate school:
 14.00.25 — pharmacology;
 00/15/01 - drug technology and organization of the pharmaceutical business;
 15.00.02 - pharmaceutical chemistry and pharmacognosy;
 03.00.13 - human and animal physiology;
 02.00.03 - organic chemistry;
 internship:
 management and economics of pharmacy;
 pharmaceutical technology;
 pharmaceutical chemistry and pharmacognosy.
 according to programs of additional education (advanced training and retraining of specialists):
 management and economics of pharmacy;
 pharmaceutical technology;
 pharmaceutical chemistry and pharmacognosy.

References

Links 
 Academy official website

Universities in Russia
1936 establishments in Russia
Pharmacy schools
Educational institutions established in 1918